Erysimum teretifolium is a species of Erysimum known by the common names Santa Cruz wallflower and Ben Lomond wallflower. It is a very rare plant endemic to Santa Cruz County, California, where it grows on inland sand spits, chaparral, and sandstone deposits in the southern Santa Cruz Mountains. It is a California state and federally listed endangered species.

This plant is a biennial or perennial herb with one or more unbranched erect dark reddish-purple stems reaching anywhere from 15 centimeters to nearly a meter in height. There are a few straight, somewhat toothed, dark greenish leaves along the stems. At the tops of the stems are thin clusters of flowers with rounded bright to dark yellow or orangish petals, each one or two centimeters long. The flowers drop to leave long, flat fruits which are siliques up to 15 centimeters long, sticking out from the stem.

This species is found only within a strip of land measuring 9 miles long by 5 miles wide. The plant is mainly threatened by coastal and inland development in the area and mining of the sand it lives in. About 75% of the remaining plants grow on land belonging to a sand mining company. Fire suppression has also altered the habitat to the detriment of the plant; leaf and needle litter builds up while the plant requires stretches of open sand. Urban development is another threat, destroying habitat and leading to habitat fragmentation.

There are about 13 known extant populations. Several others are believed to have been extirpated. Habitat that has been damaged by sand mining operations will likely never be restored to its natural condition.

References

External links
Jepson Manual Treatment for Erysimum teretifolium
USDA Plants Profile
Erysimum teretifolium Photo gallery

teretifolium
Endemic flora of California
Natural history of Santa Cruz County, California
~